Czech Republic is scheduled to compete at the 2019 European Games, in Minsk, Belarus from 21 to 30 June 2019. Czech Republic has previously competed at the 2015 European Games in Baku, Azerbaijan, where it won 7 medals.

Medalists

Archery

Recurve

Compound

Athletics

Badminton

Basketball

Boxing

Canoe sprint

Cycling

Track cycling

Road cycling

Gymnastics

Aerobic gymnastics

Artistic gymnastics

Trampoline gymnastics

Judo

Karate

Sambo

Shooting

Table tennis

Wrestling

References

Nations at the 2019 European Games
European Games
2019